In topology, a branch of mathematics, a Dehn surgery, named after Max Dehn, is a construction used to modify 3-manifolds.  The process takes as input a 3-manifold together with a link.  It is often conceptualized as two steps: drilling then filling.

Definitions

If , the drilled manifold has  torus boundary components .
 Given a 3-manifold whose boundary is made of 2-tori , we may glue in one solid torus by a homeomorphism (resp. diffeomorphism) of its boundary to each of the torus boundary components  of the original 3-manifold.  There are many inequivalent ways of doing this, in general.  This process is called Dehn filling.
 Dehn surgery on a 3-manifold containing a link consists of drilling out a tubular neighbourhood of the link together with Dehn filling on all the components of the boundary corresponding to the link.

The curves  and  generate the fundamental group of the torus , and they form a basis of its first homology group.

As long as the meridian maps to the surgery slope , the resulting Dehn surgery will yield a 3-manifold that will not depend on the specific gluing (up to homeomorphism).

In the case of links in the 3-sphere or more generally an oriented integral homology sphere, there is a canonical choice of the longitudes : every longitude is chosen so that it is null-homologous in the knot complement—equivalently, if it is the boundary of a Seifert surface.  

When the ratios  are all integers (note that this condition does not depend on the choice of the longitudes, since it corresponds to the new meridians intersecting exactly once the ancient meridians), the surgery is called an integral surgery. 
Such surgeries are closely related to handlebodies, cobordism and Morse functions.

Examples

 If all surgery coefficients are infinite, then each new meridian  is homotopic to the ancient meridian . Therefore the homeomorphism-type of the manifold is unchanged by the surgery.

In particular if the surgery coefficient is of the form , then the surgered 3-manifold is still the 3-sphere.

Results

Every closed, orientable, connected 3-manifold is obtained by performing Dehn surgery on a link in the 3-sphere.   This result, the Lickorish–Wallace theorem, was first proven by Andrew H. Wallace in 1960 and independently by W. B. R. Lickorish in a stronger form in 1962.  Via the now well-known relation between genuine surgery and cobordism, this result is equivalent to the theorem that the oriented cobordism group of 3-manifolds is trivial, a theorem originally proved by Vladimir Abramovich Rokhlin in 1951.

Since orientable 3-manifolds can all be generated by suitably decorated links, one might ask how distinct surgery presentations of a given 3-manifold might be related. The answer is called the Kirby calculus.

See also
Hyperbolic Dehn surgery
Tubular neighborhood
Surgery on manifolds, in the general sense, also called spherical modification.

References

.

.
.
.

3-manifolds
Surgery theory